

Yahorlyk Bay is a shallow water bay near the coast of Ukraine (between peninsulas Yahorlyk Kut and Kinburn peninsula), northern Black Sea. The bay is separated from the sea by chain of islands Dovhyi and Kruhlyi. It is separated from the Gulf of Tendra by Yahorlyk Kut, and from the Dnieper-Bug estuary by the Kinburn Peninsula.

The water body has 26 km long, 15 km wide, up to 5 m depth.

References

External links
 Yahorlyk Bay at the Encyclopedia of Ukraine

Bays of Ukraine